George Samuel Zimmern JP (17 February 1904 – 19 November 1979), also named in Chinese community as Canon George She (施玉麒), was a well-known social activist in Hong Kong.  Born of Eurasian parentage, he attended the Diocesan Boys' School, HK, followed by Oxford University in England. Returning to Hong Kong, some of his most remarkable jobs included barrister-at-law, magistrate, warden of St. John's Hall (1939–1952), headmaster of Diocesan Boys' School (1955–1961), and honorary canon of St. John's Cathedral. As a close friend and supporter of Bishop R. O. Hall, Canon She was one of the founders of the Street Sleepers' Shelter Society, the Boys' and Girls' Clubs Association, the Housing Society and a number of workers' children schools.  He baptised Sir Robert Ho Tung on his death bed, as well as Sir Shouson Chow. After retiring from DBS in 1961, he spent his last years in Bristol and became the priest-in-charge of Christ Church with St Ewen.

External links
 George She Memorial Dedicated at DBS, DSOBA
 知時好雨, 潤物無聲 Nicholas L. Chan, Ta Kung Pao, 23 November 2004 
 知時好雨, 潤物無聲 Nicholas L. Chan, Ta Kung Pao, 24 November 2004 

Hong Kong philanthropists
Hong Kong educators
Barristers of Hong Kong
1904 births
1979 deaths
Hong Kong Anglicans
Hong Kong expatriates in the United Kingdom
20th-century philanthropists
Hong Kong Sheng Kung Hui clergy